The Gun Hill Road station is an express station on the IRT White Plains Road Line of the New York City Subway. Located in the Bronx at the intersection of Gun Hill and White Plains Roads, it is served by the 2 train at all times and by the 5 train during rush hours in the peak direction; limited a.m. rush hour 5 trains from Manhattan also terminate at this station in the northbound direction only.

History 
This station was built under the Dual Contracts. It opened on March 3, 1917, as part of an extension of the IRT White Plains Road Line from East 177th Street–East Tremont Avenue to East 219th Street–White Plains Road, providing the Bronx communities of Williamsbridge and Wakefield with access to rapid transit service. Service on the new portion of the line was operated as a four-car shuttle from 177th Street due to the power conditions at the time.

The lower level was used by the IRT Third Avenue Line from October 4, 1920, until the line's abandonment on April 29, 1973.

The city government took over the IRT's operations on June 12, 1940. The station was renovated in 2007 at a cost of $31.68 million.

Station layout

The station was designed as a bi-level station. The upper level has three tracks and two island platforms, while the lower level had two tracks and one wide island platform. North of the station, the lower level tracks rose and joined, making a five track line for a short distance. From west to east, they were as follows: White Plains Road Line southbound local, Third Avenue Line southbound, White Plains Road Line center express, Third Avenue Line northbound, White Plains Road Line northbound local.

Exit
The station's only exit is at a street-level station house at the north side of Gun Hill Road in the median of White Plains Road. The mid-2000s refurbishment removed the Third Avenue el level and upgraded the station with the new station house at street level. The original station house was one short block north at East 211th Street. New escalators and elevators now make this station ADA-accessible.

References

External links 

IRT White Plains Road Line stations
IRT Third Avenue Line stations
New York City Subway stations in the Bronx
Railway stations in the United States opened in 1917
1917 establishments in New York City
Williamsbridge, Bronx